Jutland is a peninsula that comprises the mainland part of Denmark and part of northern Germany.

Jutland may also refer to:

Jutland, New Jersey, an unincorporated community in the United States
Jutland horse, a horse breed
Battle of Jutland, a World War I naval battle
Jutland (board game), a 1967 Battle of Jutland wargame published by Avalon Hill
Jutland (video game), a 2006 Battle of Jutland naval strategy game

See also
 Jylland (ship), a Danish steam frigate